Taisia Nikolaevna Korotkova is a Russian artist born in 1980, Moscow. She studied in the Moscow Academic Art Lyceum from 1991 until 1998 and graduated from the Moscow State Academic Art institute named after V.I Surikov in 2004. Korotkova graduated from the Institute of Contemporary Art in Moscow in 2003. In 2010, she won the Young Artist of the Year award, a Kandinsky Prize. Korotkova takes part in Russian and International exhibitions. Her works are in the collections of the Moscow Museum of Modern Art, Benetton Foundation, Republic of Austria, the Smirnov & Sorokin Foundation and the Institute of Russian Realist Art.

Work

The main questions she works on are about the relationships between human society and contemporary science, industry and technologies. The main technique of her works is tempera on gesso, on wooden panel.

List of exhibitions

Personal shows
2015 “CLOSED RUSSIA” Triumph gallery, Moscow, Russia
2013 “Light Echo” NK Gallery, Antwerpen, Belgium
2012 “Reproduction” Triumph gallery, Moscow, Russia
2011 “Reproduction” Salon Vert London, England. Colourblind gallery Koeln, Germany. Art and Space Gallery Munich, Germany.
“Beauty of Science” Gabarron foundation museum, Valladolid, Spain.
2011 “Reproduction”, Tulsky necropolis museum, Tula, Russia
2008 “Technology”,  Moscow Museum of Modern Art, Russia
2007 “Technology”, Teatergalleriet, Uppsala, Sweden

Group shows
2017 «New Literacy» the 4th Ural Industrial Biennial, Ekaterinburg, Russia
2017 «Attendance Time» NK Gallery Antwerp, Belgium
2017 «Future conversation» ABTART Gallery, Stuttgart, Germany
2016 «Metamorphoses» Schloss Pornbach, Germany
2015 "Cinema of repeat film" Special project of 6th Moscow Biennale of Contemporary art, Russia
2015 “New Storytellers in Russian Art of XX-XXI centuries” Russian museum St. Petersburg, Russia
2014 “Lenin the Icebreaker”, Lentos kunstmuseum, Linz, Austria
2013 “Lenin the Icebreaker”, Icebreaker Lenin, Murmansk, Russia
2013 “Department of labor and employment”, State Tretyakov's Gallery, Moscow, Russia
2013 “Dreams for those who are awake”, Moscow Museum of Modern Art, Moscow, Russia
2011 “REWRITING WORLDS” The 4-th Moscow Biennale of Contemporary Art, Russia
2010 “Swedish Family” Uppsala Konstmuseum, Sweden
2006 “Moscow News”, Critic's gallery, Prague, Czech Republic
2004 Rap-opera - Discussion about “Phenomenology of the soup can”, STELLA ART gallery, Moscow, Russia
2003 “Lifshitz”, ArtKLJAZMA, Festival of the Open-Air Art, Moscow region, Russia

References

1980 births
Living people
21st-century Russian artists
Artists from Moscow
Russian women artists
Kandinsky Prize